Events in the year 1963 in Turkey.

Parliament
 12th Parliament of Turkey

Incumbents
President – Cemal Gürsel
Prime Minister – İsmet İnönü
Leader of the opposition – Ragıp Gümüşpala

Ruling party and the main opposition
  Ruling party – Republican People's Party (CHP) (with coalition partners New Turkey Party (YTP) and Republican Villagers Nation Party (CKMP) up to 25 December, and then with the Independents)
  Main opposition – Justice Party (AP)

Cabinet
27th government of Turkey (up to 25 December)
28th government of Turkey (from 25 December)

Events
 1 February – Two airplanes collided over Ankara. 87 deaths
27 March – Demonstrations against Justice Party (AP) 
21 May – Attempted coup by Talat Aydemir. 
26 June – Galatasaray won the championship of Turkish football league.
12 September – Ankara Agreement between the European Union and Turkey
17 November – Local elections
27 November – After the prime minister İsmet İnönü went to United States to attend the funeral of John F. Kennedy, New Turkey Party a coalition partner withdrew from the government. This ended the 27th government.
23 December – Bloody Christmas in Cyprus where Turkish villages were attacked 
24 December –  Turkish military planes flew over Cyprus as a warning (without any action)

Births
1 January  -Fatih Altaylı, journalist
2 February – Rıza Çalımbay, footballer and manager 
10 February – Candan Erçetin, singer
1 March – Aydan Şener, actress
14 August – Yaprak Özdemiroğlu,  ballet dancer and actress
16 September -Yonca Evcimik, singer and actress
10 October – Hülya Avşar, model and actress
10 November – Tanju Çolak, footballer
29 November – Emine Ülker Tarhan, politician, lawyer

Deaths
3 May Abdülhak Şinasi Hisar (aged 76), novelist
2 October – Refet Bele (aged 82), retired general who participated in the Turkish War of Independence 
3 June Nazım Hikmet (aged 61), poet
31 October Mesut Cemil (aged 61), musician

Gallery

See also
 1962–63 Milli Lig

References

 
Years of the 20th century in Turkey
Turkey
Turkey
Turkey